Granite Harbour is a bay in the coast of Victoria Land, Antarctica, about  long, entered between Cape Archer and Cape Roberts. It was discovered and named by the British National Antarctic Expedition (1901–04) in the Discovery in January 1902, while searching for safe winter quarters for the ship. The name derives from the great granite boulders found on its shores.

See also
First View Point
Stevens Cliff

References

Bays of the Ross Dependency
Landforms of Victoria Land
Scott Coast
Ports and harbours of the Ross Dependency